The 25th Kolkata International Film Festival took place from 8 to 15 November 2019.

Inauguration 
Hosted by CM of West Bengal, Mamata Banerjee, The 25th Kolkata International Film Festival was Inaugurated by Amitabh Bachchan followed by a grand inaugural ceremony on Netaji Indoor Stadium. other guests included names like Shah Rukh khan, Jaya Bachchan, Mahesh Bhatt, Rakhee Gulzar etc. The ceremony was also graced by international film personalities like German filmmaker Volker Schlöndorff, Sex Lies and Videotape actress Andie MacDowell and Slovak film director Dušan Hanák

The Focus Country this year was Germany with 42 films.

Official Selections

Competition Categories

Asian Select (NETPAC Award)

Competition on Indian Documentary Films

Competition on Indian Language's Films

Competition on Indian Short Films

International Competition

Non-Competition Categories

50 years Celebration-RESTORED CLASSICS

Alexander Kluge (Focus: Germany)

Bengali Panorama

Cinema International

Winners 
Golden Royal Bengal Tiger Award for Best Film : LA LLORONA - Jayro Bustamante

Golden Royal Bengal Tiger Award for Best Director : THE PAINTED BIRD - Vaclav Marhoul

'Hiralal Sen Memorial Award' for Best Film : MAI GHAT CRIME NO 103- 2005 - ANANTH MAHADEVAN

'Hiralal Sen Memorial Award' Award for Best Director : Parcel - Indrasis Acharya

NETPAC Award for Best Film : Devi Aur Hero - Aditya Kripalani
Golden Royal Bengal Tiger Award for Best Indian Documentary Film : ABRIDGED - Gaurav Puri

Golden Royal Bengal Tiger Award for Best Indian Short Film : SUMMER RHAPSODY - Shravan Katikaneni

References 


Kolkata International Film Festival
2019 film festivals